The second 2006 Antarctic Ice Marathon & 100k were held in Antarctica on 13 and 15 December 2006, respectively.

Results

Marathon
Thirteen competitors from eight countries took part in the marathon race and faced temperatures of -10C. At the halfway point Henri Alain D'Andria had the lead with a decent advantage on his followers Tim Harris and Karo Ovasapyan. D'Andria was able to keep his lead in the remaining half of the race and finished in a record time of 5:08.17 hours. Noelle Sheridan, the only woman in the competition also finished the event thereby completing seven marathons on seven continents in seven months, a new Guinness World Record for women.

100 km race
Nine competitors from four nations started in the Antarctic 100k. Irishman Richard Donovan took an early lead and pressed hard over the first 25 km. Marathon winner Henri Alain D'Andria followed close behind. Over the next kilometres until the halfway point, the gap between the two widened to 40 minutes and then to an hour at the 75km point. The Irishman eased up over the final 25km to win the race in a new Antarctic 100k record of 12:55.06. Philippe Moreau and Hervé Taquet shared the third position again, just like they did in the marathon.

External links
Official website

2006 in athletics (track and field)
2006 in Antarctica